Skenea ossiansarsi is a species of sea snail, a marine gastropod mollusk in the family Skeneidae.

Description
The shell grows to a length of 1.6 mm. Skenea ossiansarsi has a small, flattened, disc-shaped body with a width of around 5 millimeters. It has a translucent white or pale yellow color with distinguish reddish-brown spots on its body and head. Skenea ossiansarsi has a circular foot that is corresponding large compared to its body. The foot is used for creeping along the substrate, and it has a slightly rough texture. The head of this sea slug is clear, with two leading tentacles that are often held upright. These tentacles have small, club-shaped tips that may be used to sense the surrounding environment or to detect prey. Like other nudibranchs, Skenea ossiansarsi has a pair of rhinophores, which are specialized sensory organs located on top of the head. These rhinophores can detect chemicals in the water, helping the sea slug to locate food and potential mates. The body of Skenea ossiansarsi is covered in small, finger-like projections called cerata, which are used for respiration and for storing and digesting food. One interesting feature of Skenea ossiansarsi's appearance is its reddish-brown spots, which are arranged in a distinctive pattern on the body and head. These spots are actually clusters of tiny, raised bumps called tubercles, which may serve a defensive function by making the sea slug more difficult to swallow or grip.

Distribution
This species occurs in European waters from Southern Iceland to Northwest Russia and off Norway It is found in the North Atlantic Ocean, specifically in the waters off the coasts of Norway and Iceland, at depths of around 50 - 150 meters.

References

 Warén A., 1991: New and little known mollusca from Iceland and Scandinavia; Sarsia 76: 53–124

External links
 

ossiansarsi
Gastropods described in 1991